Khuda Ike Muyaba (born 26 December 1993) is a Malawian footballer who plays as a forward for Polokwane City and the Malawi national team. He became top goalscorer of the 2019 Super League of Malawi with 21 goals.

References

External links

1993 births
Living people
Malawian footballers
Malawi international footballers
Moyale Barracks FC players
Silver Strikers FC players
Polokwane City F.C. players
Association football forwards
Malawian expatriate footballers
Expatriate soccer players in South Africa
Malawian expatriate sportspeople in South Africa
South African Premier Division players
National First Division players
2021 Africa Cup of Nations players